Victor Wégria (4 November 1936 – 5 June 2008) was a Belgian association football striker.

He played mostly for RFC Liégeois, and later joined Standard de Liège. Wégria finished four times top scorer of the Jupiler League (in 1959, 1960, 1961 and 1963). Only Erwin Vandenbergh managed to beat this record (he was 6 times top scorer of this competition). He was capped five times by the Belgium national football team. He died on 6 June 2008, aged 71.

References

1936 births
2008 deaths
Belgian footballers
Association football forwards
Belgium international footballers
RFC Liège players
Belgian Pro League players
Belgian football managers
RFC Liège managers